Columbus is an unincorporated rural hamlet in Hempstead County, Arkansas, United States. Columbus has the post office serving ZIP code 71831, 
an herb farm, a volunteer fire department station, a small church, a namesake cemetery, and no other businesses or services.

History

Columbus was a farming community up until the 1960s. There was once a bank owned by the Wilson family of Columbus, along with several stores and a school, the most notable store being a general store owned by David Mitchell. The stores have since been torn down. During the 1940s, Columbus school consolidated with Hope School District. The old gym was recently burnt, leaving only two doorways. Some of the prominent families of Columbus included Caldwell, Wilson, Mitchell, Hawthorne, Downs, and Stuart.

Notable person
Rogerline Johnson

References

Unincorporated communities in Hempstead County, Arkansas
Unincorporated communities in Arkansas